Spilonema maritimum is a species of lichen in the family Coccocarpiaceae. Found in Alaska, it was described as a new species in 2020 by lichenologists Toby Spribille and Alan Fryday. The type specimen was collected in Juneau Borough, on the west side of Douglas Island. Its specific epithet maritimum alludes to its close association with maritime rocks.

Description
Its asci are eight-spored, with dimensions of 30–42 by 10–13 μm. The ascospores are ellipsoid, measuring 7.8–8.9 by 3.6–3.9 μm. The results of standard chemical spot tests are all negative, and thin-layer chromatography confirms the absence of secondary chemicals.

In addition to various locations in Alaska, the lichen has also been recorded from Haida Gwaii and Vancouver Island, British Columbia.

References

Peltigerales
Lichen species
Lichens described in 2020
Lichens of Western Canada
Lichens of Subarctic America
Taxa named by Toby Spribille
Fungi without expected TNC conservation status